Kabli is a village in Estonia. It is located on coast of the Gulf of Riga, in Pärnu County and is a part of Häädemeeste Commune. It has a popular beach.

As of 2000, the population was 373.

In the 19th and 20th century, many seamen lived there. The village had also a shipyard.

References

Villages in Pärnu County